Day of the Workers of the Ukrainian Navy is holiday in Ukraine. The holiday celebrates the founding of the Ukrainian Navy. Navy Day is a professional holiday that is celebrated on every first Sunday of July.

History
The commemoration was established in 1996 (then to be celebrated August 1). Till 2012 the day was celebrated on August 1. From 2012 till 2015 Ukraine had the same date for its Navy Day as Russia (the last Sunday of July) and the Soviet Union (like Russia, Ukraine is a former Soviet republic); the Soviet Union introduced its Navy Day in June 1939; the date was chosen because of a connection with the day the Battle of Gangut took place. On 24 August 2014 Ukrainian President Petro Poroshenko declared that Ukraine should not celebrate the holidays of the "military-historical calendar of Russia" but "We will honor the defenders of our homeland, not someone else's". On 12 June 2015 a Presidential decree by Poroshenko moved Ukraine's Navy Day to every first Sunday of July.

Commemorations
The national leadership and the ranks of the Ukrainian Navy usually congratulate sailors on this professional holiday. Many distinguished employees are awarded with state awards, military ranks, commemorative gifts, government diplomas and official words of gratitude from their command. A naval parade is usually held at the port of Odessa. The parade inspection is done from the Ukrainian frigate Hetman Sahaydachniy.

See also 
 Public holidays in Ukraine
 Navy Day

Notes

References 

Recurring events established in 1993
1993 establishments in Ukraine
Observances in Ukraine
Summer events in Ukraine
Ukrainian Navy